In mathematics,  logarithmic Sobolev inequalities are a class of inequalities involving the norm of a function f, its logarithm, and its gradient . These inequalities were discovered and named by Leonard Gross, who established them  in dimension-independent form, in the context of constructive quantum field theory. Similar results were discovered by other mathematicians before and many variations on such inequalities are known.

Gross proved the inequality:

 

 

where  is the entropy functional.

Notes

References

Axiomatic quantum field theory
Sobolev spaces
Logarithms